Dellamora is a genus of beetles in the family Mordellidae, containing the following species:

 Dellamora aesura Ray, 1949
 Dellamora antipodes Ray, 1930
 Dellamora bakeri Ray, 1930
 Dellamora bomora Ray, 1949
 Dellamora curticauda Ray, 1949
 Dellamora epiblema Ray, 1949
 Dellamora gracilicauda (Blair, 1922)
 Dellamora greenwoodi (Blair, 1922)
 Dellamora gregis Ray, 1948
 Dellamora iridescens Ray, 1930
 Dellamora macaria Ray, 1949
 Dellamora maculata Ray, 1930
 Dellamora ochracea Ray, 1930
 Dellamora palposa Normand, 1916
 Dellamora parva Ray, 1949
 Dellamora philippinensis Ray, 1930
 Dellamora pubescens Ray, 1936
 Dellamora samoensis (Blair, 1928)
 Dellamora walteriana Franciscolo, 1990

References

Mordellidae